Vicky Funari is a documentary filmmaker. She attended film school at New York University's undergraduate program. She currently teaches at Haverford College as Artist-in-Residence. She directed Maquilapolis (2006) alongside Sergio De La Torre in collaboration with the women of Grupo Factor X, Colectivo Chilpancingo, and Promotoras por los Derechos de las Mujeres.

Filmography 
 Paulina (1998)
 Live Nude Girls Unite! (2000)
 Maquilapolis (2006)
 Strong! (2012) - editor

Awards

References

American filmmakers
Haverford College faculty
Year of birth missing (living people)
Living people
Place of birth missing (living people)
New York University alumni